Harri Tuohimaa (born 21 November 1959) is a Finnish ice hockey player. He competed in the men's tournament at the 1984 Winter Olympics.

Career statistics

Regular season and playoffs

International

References

External links

1959 births
Living people
Olympic ice hockey players of Finland
Ice hockey players at the 1984 Winter Olympics
Sportspeople from Turku